is a Japanese football player for Omiya Ardija.

Club statistics
Updated to end of 2018 season.

References

External links
Profile at Zweigen Kanazawa
Profile at Kashima Antlers

1996 births
Living people
Association football people from Ibaraki Prefecture
Japanese footballers
J1 League players
J3 League players
Kashima Antlers players
J.League U-22 Selection players
Zweigen Kanazawa players
Association football midfielders

Omiya Ardija players